is a series of high school baseball-themed video games, released in Japan. The first two titles were released by K Amusement Leasing for the Family Computer and Super Famicom, while the others were released by Magical Company (also known as Mahou). The characters are based on real athletes.

Games
The following is a list of games released in the series.

 Released in 2004 by Midas Interactive Entertainment in Europe as League Series Baseball 2
 Started broadcasting in 2005, produced in collaboration with G-Mode

External links
Mahou official website 
Kōshien series at MobyGames

Video game franchises introduced in 1989
Baseball video games
High school baseball in Japan
Japan-exclusive video games
Magical Company games
Game Boy Color games
Mobile games
Nintendo Entertainment System games
PlayStation (console) games
PlayStation 2 games
Sega Saturn games
Super Nintendo Entertainment System games
Video game franchises
Video games developed in Japan
Video games set in Japan